Ondrej Vrábel may refer to:
 Ondrej Vrábel (philanthropist), Slovak philanthropist, programmer, co-founder of civic association Mladí and entrepreneur
 Ondrej Vrábel (footballer), Slovak footballer who plays for Nitra as a midfielder